Doraha is a panchayat village in the Sehore district, Madhya Pradesh, India.

Dost Mohammad Khan, Nawab of Bhopal acquired the control of Doraha in the early 18th century. After the Battle of Bhopal (1737), a peace treaty was signed between Peshwa Bajirao of Maratha empire and Jai Singh II of Mughal empire at Doraha on 7 January 1738.

References 

Villages in Sehore district